WNBD-LD (channel 33) is a low-power television station licensed to Grenada, Mississippi, United States, serving as the NBC affiliate for the Delta area. It is owned by Imagicomm Communications alongside Greenwood-licensed dual ABC/Fox affiliate WABG-TV (channel 6) and Cleveland-licensed low-power CBS affiliate WXVT-LD (channel 17). The three stations share studios on Washington Avenue in Greenville; WNBD-LD's transmitter is located northeast of Inverness, Mississippi.

Due to the low-power transmission, WNBD-LD's over-the-air digital signal just misses Grenada but covers the major cities in the viewing area.

History
WNBD-LD is the first NBC affiliate ever based in the market—prior to its launch, viewers in the region received NBC programming on cable or over-the-air from KTVE in El Dorado, Arkansas, WLBT in Jackson, and/or WMC-TV in Memphis, Tennessee. Tentative launch of the channel was scheduled for between mid-October and early November 2010. It filed an application for a "license to cover" on October 21. The actual sign-on occurred December 13.  Soon after WNBD-LD's sign-on, it became available on Suddenlink Communications channel 9, with WLBT and WMC remaining in their channel positions. While current Federal Communications Commission (FCC) must-carry rules do not require carriage of low-powered stations, Commonwealth had the right to require cable systems to carry WNBD as part of retransmission consent compensation for carrying WABG.

Commonwealth Broadcasting Group agreed to sell WNBD-LD, WABG-TV, and WFXW-LD to Cala Broadcast Partners for $11.7 million on October 30, 2015. Cala is jointly owned by Brian Brady (who owns several other television stations, mostly under the Northwest Broadcasting name) and Jason Wolff (who owns radio and television stations through Frontier Radio Management). Concurrently with this acquisition, Cala agreed to purchase WXVT from H3 Communications; a month later, it assigned its right to purchase that station to John Wagner. The sale was completed on August 1, 2016. on that date, the station went off the air, with Wagner stating in a filing with the FCC that it was looking for new programming. This resulted in the WXVT intellectual unit, including CBS programming, being moved to a digital subchannel of  WNBD-LD and mapped to WXVT's former channel 15. WNBD-LD would serve as an NBC and CBS affiliate until the CBS affiliation moved to WXVT-LD on June 26, 2017.

On January 1, 2017, Cable One (now Sparklight) removed channels owned by Northwest Broadcasting (WNBD-LD, WABG-TV, WXVT and WABG-DT2) after the two companies failed to reach an agreement. On February 1, 2017, the channels were restored to Cable One's lineup under a new carriage deal.

In February 2019, Reuters reported that Apollo Global Management had agreed to acquire the entirety of Brian Brady's television portfolio, which it intends to merge with Cox Media Group (which Apollo is acquiring at the same time) and stations spun off from Nexstar Media Group's purchase of Tribune Broadcasting, once the purchases are approved by the FCC. In March 2019 filings with the FCC, Apollo confirmed that its newly-formed broadcasting group, Terrier Media, would acquire Northwest Broadcasting, with Brian Brady holding an unspecified minority interest in Terrier. In June 2019, it was announced that Terrier Media would instead operate as Cox Media Group, as Apollo had reached a deal to also acquire Cox's radio and advertising businesses. The transaction was completed on December 17.

On March 29, 2022, Cox Media Group announced it would sell WNBD-LD, WXVT-LD, WABG-TV and 15 other stations to Imagicomm Communications, an affiliate of the parent company of the INSP cable channel, for $488 million; the sale was completed on August 1.

Programming

Syndicated programming
Syndicated programming on WNBD-LD includes Rachael Ray, The Real,  The Ellen DeGeneres Show, and The Big Bang Theory.

Newscasts
As of August 2016, WNBD-LD merged its news operation with that of WABG-TV (along with WXVT-LD), under the brand name The Delta News. Prior to that, WNBD-LD produced its own evening newscasts with anchor Lakiya Scott.

Subchannel

References

External links
Official website

NBD-LD
NBC network affiliates
CBS network affiliates
Television channels and stations established in 2010
Low-power television stations in the United States
2010 establishments in Mississippi
Imagicomm Communications
2022 mergers and acquisitions